Blue Train is a studio album by John Coltrane which was released in January 1958 by Blue Note Records. Recorded at the Van Gelder Studio in Hackensack, New Jersey, it is the only Blue Note recording by Coltrane as session leader. It has been certified a gold record by the RIAA.

Background
The album was recorded in the midst of Coltrane's residency at the Five Spot as a member of the Thelonious Monk quartet. The personnel include Coltrane's Miles Davis bandmates, Paul Chambers on bass and Philly Joe Jones on drums, both of whom had worked before with pianist Kenny Drew. Both trumpeter Lee Morgan and trombonist Curtis Fuller were up-and-coming jazz musicians, and both were  members of Art Blakey's Jazz Messengers in due course. Unlike his previous label, Blue Note paid the musicians to rehearse the music for a couple of days before the recording session.

All of the compositions were written by Coltrane, with the exception of the standard "I'm Old Fashioned". Though at this point his compositions used conventional diatonic harmonies, they were set in unconventional ways. The title track is a bluesy song with a quasi-minor (Eb7#9) theme. "Locomotion" is also a blues riff tune, in forty-four-bar form. "Lazy Bird" is in part a transposition into the key of "G" of the Tadd Dameron composition "Lady Bird".

Coltrane's playing exhibits the move toward what would become his signature style. His solos are more harmonic or "vertical" and lines arpeggiated. His timing was often apart from or over the beat, rather than playing on or behind it. During a 1960 interview, Coltrane described Blue Train as his favorite album of his own up to that point.

Michael Cuscuna, the reissue producer at Blue Note had this to say from Joe Vella's podcast "Traneumentary": "We’re listening to Blue Train, which to me is one of the most beautiful pieces on one of the most beautiful records that Coltrane recorded in the fifties. It’s his first real mature statement and he wrote all but one of the tunes on this album which was very rare in the fifties and each one is a gem, particularly the title tune Blue Train. And while it’s kind of easy to play the blues, this has a suspended and haunting kind of quality to it."

Legacy
John Coltrane's next major album, Giant Steps, recorded in 1959, would break new melodic and harmonic ground in jazz, whereas Blue Train adheres to the hard bop style of the era. Musicologist Lewis Porter has also demonstrated a harmonic relationship between Coltrane's "Lazy Bird" and Tadd Dameron's "Lady Bird".

In 1997, The Ultimate Blue Train was released, adding two alternate takes and enhanced content, and in 1999 a 24bit 192 kHz DVD-Audio version was issued. In 2003, both a Super Audio Compact Disc version was released, as well as a remastered compact disc as part of Blue Note's Rudy Van Gelder series.

In 2000 it was voted number 339 in Colin Larkin's All Time Top 1000 Albums. He stated "Coltrane may have made more important albums, but none swung as effectively as this one."

In 2015, Blue Note/Universal released a Blu-Ray Audio edition of the album with four bonus tracks, one of which is a previously unreleased take of "Lazy Bird".

Track listing
All tracks written by John Coltrane except where noted.

 Sides one and two were combined as tracks 1–5 on CD reissues.

Personnel
 John Coltrane – tenor saxophone
 Lee Morgan – trumpet
 Curtis Fuller – trombone
 Kenny Drew – piano
 Paul Chambers – bass
 Philly Joe Jones – drums

Charts

Certifications

References

Bibliography
 
 

1958 albums
Albums produced by Alfred Lion
Blue Note Records albums
Grammy Hall of Fame Award recipients
Hard bop albums
John Coltrane albums
Instrumental albums
Albums recorded at Van Gelder Studio